Portrait of a Zombie is a 2012 Irish horror film directed by Bing Bailey and written by Bailey and Laura Morand Bailey. It was released on March 3, 2012.  Patrick Murphy plays a young man whose family decides to accept him when he turns into a zombie.

Plot 
During a zombie outbreak in Ireland, an American documentary film crew become interested in the story of a local Irish family who decide to keep their zombie-turned son a part of the family.  When the film crew arrives in Ireland, they discover that the family's decision has angered their neighbors and a local crime boss.  As tempers rise, the Americans document the controversy.

Cast 
 Todd Fletcher as American Filmmaker
 Patrick Murphy as Billy
 Geraldine McAlinden as Lizzy
 Rory Mullen as Danny
 Paul O'Bryan as Darren
 Sonya O'Donoghue as Louise

Production 
The film was originally more of a genre film, but budget constraints meant that director Bing Bailey needed to turn it into a hybrid of mockumentary and genre film.  Bailey said that he wanted to "have his Evil Dead experience".  Pre-production was done over the Internet, as Bailey was living in the United States at the time.  Shooting took place in October 2009, May 2010, and May 2011; the additional shoots were due to a revamp of the initial concept that involved abandoned man-on-the-street interviews.  Post-production took another 18 months.

Release 
Portrait of a Zombie premiered at the 2012 Cinequest Film Festival.

Reception 
Mark L. Miller of Ain't It Cool News called it "a mix of comedy, gore, drama, and action that works in ways few others have."  Richard von Busack of Metro Silicon Valley wrote that the film "stands comparison to Shaun of the Dead itself."

References

External links 
 
 

2012 films
2012 horror films
Irish horror films
Irish independent films
Irish zombie films
English-language Irish films
2010s English-language films